Arjan Konterman (28 July 1990) is a Dutch professional darts player who currently plays in Professional Darts Corporation (PDC) and World Darts Federation (WDF) events. He qualified for the 2023 WDF World Darts Championship.

Career
Konterman began his career in local tournaments, where he had occasional success. In February 2020, he took part in the 2020 Dutch Open, where he advanced to the ninth round and finally lost to Brian Raman by 1–4 in legs. The coronavirus pandemic caused his career to slow down significantly. During this time, he honed his skills and returned to international competition in 2021. In December 2021, he took part in the qualifiers for the WDF World Darts Championship, but lost in the Last 32 phase to Jeffrey Bekema by 1–4 in legs.

In 2022, he achieved great success by advancing to the 2022 Dutch Darts Championship as a host-nation qualifier. In the first round, he lost to Danny Noppert by 0–6 in legs. Two weeks later, he took part in the 2022 Dutch Open, where he again advanced to the final stage of the tournament. On his way to the eighth round, he defeated Francesco Raschini and Jordan Brooks. He lost to Thibault Tricole by 1–4 in legs. In December, he made his World  Masters debut. In the group-stage phase he finished second, which allowed him to advance to the next round, but in the next match he lost to Luke Littler by 0–5 in legs. A day later, he won a qualification for the 2023 WDF World Darts Championship.

In January 2023, he took part in the PDC Q-School qualifying tournament.

World Championship results

WDF
 2023:

Performance timeline

References

1990 births
Living people
Dutch darts players
21st-century Dutch people